Orbona is a genus of moths of the family Noctuidae.

Species
 Orbona fragariae (Vieweg, 1790)

References
Natural History Museum Lepidoptera genus database
Orbona at funet

Cuculliinae